Nora Salinas (born Nora Alicia Ortiz Salinas on June 7, 1976, in Monterrey, México) is a Mexican actress and former model. She has appeared in numerous soap operas, several plays and film "Cicatrices" for which she won a "Diosa de Plata" award as New Actress.

Career
Salinas first obtained international recognition in the telenovela "Esmeralda" alongside Leticia Calderon, as the damsel in distress Graciela.
She was noticed in Esmeralda for her ability to portray the dramatic and often extremely love-obsessed character of Graciela who was in love with a poor foreman Adrian (Alejandro Ruiz) but has to suffer under the control of her aristocratic mother Fatima (Laura Zapata).

She was further internationally recognized as the antagonist Fedra in the telenovela "Rosalinda". In Rosalinda, Salinas portrayed a cruel and ambitious woman who makes the lead character, Rosalinda (Thalia) suffer.
As a new twist in her career, veering away from her villainous and often mature roles, Salinas joined the telenovela for children, "Carita de Angel".
In "Carita de Angel" Salinas gave life to the character of Tia Pelucas. Salinas showcased her comic side in "Carita de Angel" and was identified with the characters various wig color changes.

Her more recent important work is Fuego en la Sangre, where she portrayed the role of the conservative Sarita, who eventually discovers true love from a man who happens to be her family's mortal enemy.

Personal life
Nora was born in Monterrey. Her parents are Nora Alicia Salinas de León and Jose Luis Ortiz. Her siblings are José Luis, Natalia and Karla. She was a model before she became an actress, and she won 'Miss Tamaulipas' in 1993 and came in second place in the Miss Mexico Pageant the same year. Later in 1996 she won the 'El Rostro del Heraldo' award.

Salinas was married briefly to Miguel Borbolla, from 2002 to 2004, and they have a son together, José Miguel, born in 2002. She has a daughter called Scarlett Becker Ortiz, born in 2010 with Mauricio Becker.

Filmography

Films

Television

Awards and nominations

TVyNovelas Awards

Premios Diosa de Plata

As herself

References

External links

1976 births
Living people
Mexican telenovela actresses
Mexican television actresses
Mexican film actresses
Mexican female models
Actresses from Monterrey
20th-century Mexican actresses
21st-century Mexican actresses